is an anime television series produced by Nippon Animation and directed by Hiroshi Saitô, which premiered on January 6, 1980, and ending its run on December 28 the same year. It is based on the well-known and popular 1876 novel The Adventures of Tom Sawyer by Mark Twain (and partially on The Adventures of Huckleberry Finn).

The series was broadcast on the World Masterpiece Theater, an animation staple on Fuji TV, that each year showcased an animated version of a classical book or story of Western literature, and was originally titled Tom Sawyer no Bōken. It was the second installment of the series, after Rascal the Raccoon in 1977, to feature the work of an American author.

This series was dubbed into English by Saban International and broadcast on HBO in 1988 under the title The Adventures of Tom Sawyer at 7:30 am. It alternated with the later World Masterpiece Theater version of Little Women. Celebrity Home Entertainment released videos in the United States under the title All New Adventures of Tom Sawyer.

A different English dub of the series has been shown in Southeast Asia. In 1997, 2008 and 2014, it was shown on ABS-CBN. In 2015 and 2016, a digitally remastered version was shown on the ABS-CBN Digital TV subchannel Yey! in the Philippines. It has also been dubbed in other languages, including French, Italian, Arabic, Hebrew, Portuguese, German, Hungarian, Dutch and Spanish. In January 2011, it was shown in the United States in the original Japanese on the NHK's cable channel TV Japan.

Adventure anime and manga

Characters

Sawyers
Tom Sawyer: Masako Nozawa in Japanese, Barbara Goodson in English dub.
Sid Sawyer: Sumiko Shirakawa in Japanese, Brianne Siddall in English dub.
Aunt Polly: Haru Endo
Mary Sawyer: Kaoru Ozawa in Japanese, Melora Harte in English dub.

Phelpses
Sally Phelps: Natsuko Kawaji
Silas Phelps: Minoru Yada
Penny Phelps: Yoshiko Matsuo
Oscar Phelps: Kaneto Shiozawa in Japanese, Michael McConnohie in English dub.

Finns
Huckleberry Finn: Kazuyo Aoki in Japanese, Wanda Nowicki in English dub
Pap Finn: Toshiya Ueda

Thatchers
Becky Thatcher: Keiko Han
Judge Edward Thatcher: Ichiro Murakoshi
Margaret & Jeff Thatcher: Yumi Nakatani

Others
Jim: Ikuo Nishikawa
Amy Lawrence: Kaoru Kurosu, Sanae Takagi
Ben Rogers: Mie Azuma, Atsuko Mine
Alfred Temple: Masako Sugaya
Billy Fisher: Naoki Tatsuta, Ikuo Nishikawa
Muff Potter: Eken Mine in Japanese, Robert V. Barron in English dub.
Dr. Robinson: Jun Hazumi
Injun Joe: Eiji Kanie and Kenji Utsumi (episodes 38-49) in Japanese, Tom Wyner in English dub.
Mr. Dobbins: Ichirō Nagai
Joe Harper: Kazuhiko Inoue
Sheriff Collins: Taimei Suzuki
Widow Douglas: Keiko Kuge, Barbara Goodson in English dub.
Dr. Michael Mitchell: Tadao Futami in Japanese, Michael Forest in English dub.
Dr. Helmen: Mike Reynolds in English dub.
Lisette Jean
Prosecutor: Richard Epcar in English dub.
Peter (the cat)
Caesar (the dog)

Episodes 

English episode titles from the 1988 Saban dub are listed in parentheses.

International titles 
As aventuras de Tom Sawyer (Portuguese)
De avonturen van Tom Sawyer (Dutch)
Las Aventuras de Tom Sawyer (Spanish)
Le avventure di Tom Sawyer (Italian)
Les Aventures de Tom Sawyer (French)
Przygody Tomka Sawyera (Polish)
Tom Sawyer (Spanish)
Tom Sawyer no Bōken (Japanese)
Tom Sawyers Abenteuer (German)
Tom Story
توم سوير (Arabic)
ماجراهای تام سایر (Persian)
トム・ソーヤーの冒険 (Japanese)
湯姆歷險記 (Chinese (Taiwan))

Reception
 Awarded Best Film Award for TV by the Children's Cultural Affairs Agency, Government of Japan

References

External links

The Adventures of Tom Sawyer (on Amazon Prime)

Further reading
 Dani Cavallaro (2010) Anime and the Art of Adaptation: Eight Famous Works from Page to Screen. Jefferson, N.C., McFarland & Co.
 Hyoseak Choi (2017) Losing the War, Winning the Pooh: Ishii Momoko and the Construction of Contemporary Children's Literature in Postwar Japan (University of Toronto, unpublished MA thesis).

1980 anime television series debuts
Japanese children's animated comedy television series
Works based on The Adventures of Tom Sawyer
Fuji TV original programming
Television shows based on American novels
Television series set in the 1840s
Television shows set in Missouri
World Masterpiece Theater series
HBO original programming
Television shows based on works by Mark Twain